James Langham may refer to:

Sir James Langham, 2nd Baronet (1621–1699)            
Sir James Langham, 7th Baronet (1736–1795) 
Sir James Langham, 10th Baronet (1776–1833), of the Langham baronets
James Wallace Langham, American actor